Rahul Vedprakash Patil is an Indian politician and a member of Maharashtra Legislative Assembly representing Parbhani from 2014 as a Shiv Sena politician. .

Political career
He started his political career by contesting Maharashtra assembly elections in 2014 as a Shiv Sena candidate from Parbhani (Vidhan Sabha constituency) and won by margin of 26524 votes. He got re-elected by margin of 81,790 votes in 2019 Maharashtra state assembly elections.

References

Maharashtra MLAs 2014–2019
People from Marathwada
People from Parbhani
1975 births
Living people
Marathi politicians
Shiv Sena politicians
People from Parbhani district